The following list of Carnegie libraries in Illinois provides detailed information on United States Carnegie libraries in Illinois, where 106 public libraries were built from 105 grants (totaling $1,661,200) awarded by the Carnegie Corporation of New York from 1903 to 1914. In addition, academic libraries were built at five institutions (totaling $90,000).

Key

Carnegie libraries

Academic libraries

See also

 Illinois Carnegie Libraries Multiple Property Submission

Notes

References

Note: The above references, while all authoritative, are not entirely mutually consistent. Some details of this list may have been drawn from one of the references (usually Jones) without support from the others.  Reader discretion is advised.

Illinois
Carnegie Libraries
 
Libraries